ALV or Alv may refer to:

Animal Liberation Victoria, the Australian animal rights organisation based in Melbourne
Alvechurch railway station, Worcestershire, United Kingdom (National Rail code)
The Finnish value added tax
 Alv, a character in the 2002 TV show Kiddy Grade (see List of Kiddy Grade characters#Alv)
American Literary Version
Avian leukosis virus
Autoliv (ticker symbol)